Kharaa River is a river in central northern Mongolia. 
It starts in a confluence between Sögnögör River and Mandal River near the center of Batsümber sum in Töv aimag, and then continues in a roughly north-western direction through Selenge aimag.
On the last stretch it flows through the Darkhan-Uul aimag, running along its western border and passing the city of Darkhan before entering the Orkhon River near the northern tip of the aimag.

See also
List of rivers of Mongolia

References

Rivers of Mongolia